Penlan Association Football Club is an amateur Welsh football team based in Penlan, Swansea, Wales. They play in the West Wales Premier League which is in the fourth tier of the Welsh football league system.

History
Formed in 2006, the team have been champions of the top division of the Swansea Senior Football League five times since the 2011–12 season.  For the 2020–21 season the club joined the newly formed tier 4 West Wales Premier League. The first season of the competition was cancelled due to the Coronavirus pandemic and in the 2021–22 season the club were the inaugural champions of the league losing only one game all season. Penlan AFC also won the West Wales Premier League Cup, claiming a historic double.

Honours
West Wales Premier League – Champions: 2021–22
West Wales Premier League Cup – Winners: 2021–22
Swansea Senior Football League Division One – Champions (5): 2011–12; 2013–14; 2014–15; 2015–16; 2018–19
Swansea Senior Football League Division One – Runners-up (4): 2010–11; 2016–17; 2017–18; 2019–20
Swansea Senior Football League Division Two – Runners-up: 2006–07
Swansea Senior Football League Senior Cup – Winners:  2016–17; 2017–18; 2018–19
FAW Trophy – Runners-up (1): 2016–17
West Wales Intermediate Challenge Cup – Winners: 2013–14
West Wales Intermediate Challenge Cup – Runners-up: 2012–13; 2017–18

References

External links
Club official twitter
Club official facebook

Football clubs in Wales
West Wales Premier League clubs
Sport in Swansea
Association football clubs established in 2006
2006 establishments in Wales
Swansea Senior League clubs
Football clubs in Swansea